Dhaka-5 is a constituency represented in the Jatiya Sangsad (National Parliament) of Bangladesh. Since 2008, it has been held by Habibur Rahman Mollah of the Awami League until 2020.

Boundaries 
The constituency encompasses Dhaka South City Corporation wards 48 through 50, and four union parishads of Demra, Jatrabari, and Shyampur thanas: Dhania, Demra, Matuail, and Sarulia.

History 
The constituency was created for the first general elections in newly independent Bangladesh, held in 1973.

Ahead of the 2008 general election, the Election Commission redrew constituency boundaries to reflect population changes revealed by the 2001 Bangladesh census. The 2008 redistricting altered the boundaries of the constituency.

Members of Parliament

Elections

Elections in the 2010s

Elections in the 2000s

Elections in the 1990s 

Khaleda Zia stood for five seats in the 1991 general election: Bogra-7,  Dhaka-5, Dhaka-9, Feni-1, and Chittagong-8. After winning all five, she chose to represent Feni-1 and quit the other four, triggering by-elections in them. Mohammad Quamrul Islam of the BNP was elected in a September 1991 by-election.

References

External links
 

Parliamentary constituencies in Bangladesh
Dhaka District